Albertus Magnus High School, also known as AMHS, Albertus, and Magnus, is an American Catholic, co-educational high school located in Bardonia, New York, named after the German philosopher and theologian of the same name.  It is the only Catholic high school in Rockland County, New York.

The school is administered by the Dominican Sisters of Sparkill, which was founded on May 6, 1876, in New York City by Mother Catherine Mary Antoninus Thorpe. Albertus Magnus High School is one of the many schools and missions in New York State, Missouri, Maryland, Montana, Pakistan, and Peru staffed by the Sparkill Dominicans in their 130-year history.

More than 80 percent of the student body participates in the many extracurricular activities available at the school.

History

At the request of Cardinal Spellman in the early 1950s, the Dominican Sisters of Sparkill founded Albertus Magnus High School.

In July 1957, the property was purchased and thus began the journey of Albertus Magnus, the first Catholic secondary school in Rockland County.

By September 1960, the new school and convent were ready for occupancy.

Since the first graduating class in 1961, 7,189 students have graduated from the school.

A major emphasis of the curriculum is teaching Catholic doctrine, the responsibility to the community, and spiritual growth.

The school is accredited by the  Middle States Association, Commission on Secondary Schools.

Activities

Sports 
Sports offered by the school include:

 baseball
 basketball
 cheerleading
 competitive cheerleading
 cross-country running
 field hockey
 football
 golf
 ice hockey
 lacrosse
 softball
 swimming
 soccer
 tennis
 track (winter and spring)
 volleyball

The school's mascot is the Falcon.

 Other activities
Other extracurricular activities include:

 Albert
 anime literary club
 art
 Campus Ministry
 choir
 drama
  Eucharistic ministers
 honor societies
 International Club
 literary magazine
 Magnus Monitor (the school's newspaper)
 Midnight Run
 mock trial
 peer counseling
 Photography Club
 pro-life
 robotics
 Ski/Snowboard Club
 Student Council
 Veritas honors chorus

See also
St. Gregory Barbarigo School

Notes and references
Middle States Association, Commission on Secondary Schools "Middle States Association, Commission on Secondary Schools". Retrieved 2009-05-27.

1960 establishments in New York (state)
Catholic secondary schools in New York (state)
Dominican schools in the United States
Educational institutions established in 1960
Schools in Rockland County, New York